= Portrait of a Tearful Woman =

1936 photograph by Man Ray

Portrait of a Tearful Woman (1936) by Man Ray

Portrait of Tearful Woman is a hand colored photograph by American visual artist Man Ray, created in 1936. It was originally a black and white photograph but the artist worked it by hand to create the final result. As such it can be considered that unites the artistry of Man Ray both as a photographer and as a painter. The original negative of the photograph is held at the Musée National d'Art Moderne, in Paris.

== History and description ==
Man Ray was an established photographer of the Parisian artistic scene when he created this photograph in 1936. He was working at the time as a portrait photographer for the Harper’s Bazaar magazine. The subject of the current portrait remains unknown, it was perhaps a local model. Even if it wasn't usual, Man Ray sometimes worked on his prints with colored pencils or ink, "In order to enhance the image, to make them appear more like drawings”, like Merry Foresta stated in a 1988 exhibition catalogue. The artist shows his talent in his hand coloring of the hair, eyes and lips of the model, giving her a pictorical look. He explained that he never had left his first passion for painting: “It was inevitable that the continued contact with painters should keep smoldering in me my first passion - painting... Ideas came to me that demanded a more flexible medium for their expression than the rigidity of the camera. To be sure, I had used photography as freely as I dared, or rather to the limits of my inventive capacities, but color was lacking”.

This photograph illustrates Man Ray experimentation with diverse photographic techniques at the time, including color photographs, with the tri-color carbro process and autochromes, and also with the use of multiple exposures over negatives, solarisation and the creation of camera-less photographs, which he called "rayographs".

== Art market ==
A print of this photograph was sold by $2,167,500 at Christie's, New York, on 17 May 2017, way over the estimate $400,000-$600,000.
